The State University of Padang (abbreviated UNP) is state university in Padang, West Sumatra, Indonesia, On the 23rd of October 1954, it was established by the Ministry of Education Indonesia. Currently, the rector is Prof. Ganefri, Ph.D. Previously, the rector was Prof. Dr. Phil. H. Yanuar Kiram. Based on SK BANPT 2989/SK/BAN-PT/Akred/PT/XII/2016, State University of Padang obtained "A" grade accreditation.

It is included as one of the '50 promising universities in Indonesia'.

Faculties 

The university consists of nine faculties:

 Faculty of Education
 Faculty of Language and Arts
 Faculty of Mathematics and Natural Sciences
 Faculty of Social Science
 Faculty of Engineering
 Faculty of Sport Science
 Faculty of Economics
 Faculty of Hospitality and Tourism
 Faculty of Graduate Studies
 Faculty of Psychology and Health

References

External links
 University Website

Universities in Indonesia
Universities in West Sumatra
Indonesian state universities